Florence Nakiwala Kiyingi (née Florence Nakiwala), is a Ugandan  businesswoman and politician. She is the current presidential advisor for Youth and Children Affairs in Uganda. She was appointed to this position on 6 June 2021. She is the former Minister of State for Youth and Children Affairs in the Cabinet of Uganda. She was  appointed to that position on 6 June 2016 to 6 June 2021  She is also the Federation of Uganda Football Associations third Vice-President, the first woman to hold that position in Uganda.  As well serves as the Chairperson Commonwealth Youth Ministers Task force voted to that position in 2017.

Background and education
Florence Nakiwala was born in 1972, in Kimanya, Masaka District,  to the late Charles Ssonko and Perepetwa Najjuma, as the 8th born of their 12 offspring. Her father was the County Chief of Buddu at that time. She attended Kimanya Primary School before she was admitted to Trinity College Nabbingo for her O-Level and A-Level education. While at Nabbingo, she was appointed the sanitary prefect at the school.

She studied at Makerere University, graduating with a Bachelor of Commerce degree.She has a doctorate degree in leadership from CommonWealth University. While there, she was elected to the executive committee of Nkoba Za Mbogo, the Baganda students’ organisation at Makerere University. She also served as the leader of the commerce students in her course. In her first year at Makerere, she met and eventually fell in love with her husband, Deogratius Kiyingi, the Member of Parliament for Bukomansimbi South Constituency in the 10th Parliament (2016 - 2021).

Career in business
As a teenager, still in middle school, she took a trip to London and witnessed how a well-run health facility operates. This created a burning desire in her to own a well-run healthcare facility when she grew up. After graduating from Makerere she established Lisa Medical Centre, a chain of clinics and short-stay hospitals in Uganda, with a branch in Nairobi, Kenya.

Career in Buganda Government
She served as the Minister for Youth Affairs in the Kingdom of Buganda, for a period of five years. She then served as the Tourism Minister in the kingdom, a post she held until June 2016.

Career in national politics
During the 2016 national elections, Florence Nakwala contested the Kampala Women Representative seat in the 10th parliament (2016 - 2021). She ran on the Democratic Party ticked. She lost to the incumbent, Nabilah Naggayi Sempala of the Forum for Democratic Change political party. In a surprise move, President Yoweri Museveni named Nakiwala Minister of State for Youth and Children, on 6 June 2016.

Personal
Florence Nakiwala Kiyingi is married to Dogratius Kiyingi since 1998. They are of the Roman Catholic faith. Together, they are parents to five children, three boys and two girls. Effective 6 June 2016, she was appointed chairperson of Express FC, a member of Uganda Super League.

See also
 Cabinet of Uganda
 Parliament of Uganda

References

External links
 Website of Florence Nakiwala Kiyingi

Parliament of Uganda]]

Living people
Kampala District
Members of the Parliament of Uganda
Government ministers of Uganda
People from Central Region, Uganda
1972 births
21st-century Ugandan women politicians
21st-century Ugandan politicians
Women government ministers of Uganda
Women members of the Parliament of Uganda
People educated at Trinity College Nabbingo